Vladimir Fedorovich Mitkevich (1872–1951) was a Russian scientist and electrical engineer.

In 1929, Mitkevich participated in the Second International Congress of the History of Science held in London in June–July 1931.

References

1872 births
1951 deaths
Russian electrical engineers